The Middle Eastern Geodatabase for Antiquities (MEGA) is a web based geographic information system or GIS developed by the Getty Conservation Institute (GCI), with matching funds from the World Monuments Fund (WMF) and in partnership with the Jordanian Department of Antiquities (DoA). The GIS will serve as the primary tool for the Jordanian DoA in its ongoing work to inventory, monitor, and manage Jordan's vast number of archaeological sites.

The system 

MEGA–Jordan is, at its core, an electronic inventory capable of maintaining information on site location and extent, site characteristics, and site condition in an easy-to-use manner. Ultimately it will help standardize and centralize information on archaeological sites throughout the country in a single system focused primarily on the aims of heritage management and research. MEGA–Jordan will become the DoA's preeminent planning and decision-making tool, addressing its needs and demands related to the legal protection of sites, site management, infrastructure and development control, World Heritage requirements, and development of national and regional research strategies. Infrastructure and development planning are especially crucial, and the GIS will permit the DoA to assess the potential impact of development projects (e.g., construction of buildings, roadways, pipelines) on or near archaeological sites. MEGA–Jordan is also seen as a tool for coordinating archaeological site data with Jordanian government ministries (e.g., Tourism and Antiquities, Planning, Agriculture) and for academic research.

The system offers various levels of user access based on user roles—i.e., some users will have full access to all data and the ability to add and edit sites and their attributes, approve new sites, run administrative reports, and export data, while others may only have access to search and view the data.

The MEGA system was built by Farallon Geographics using open source software, which means that its software code is not exclusively owned. This allows it to be updated, modified, and customized to meet future needs at little or no cost. It is fully compatible with all standard GIS tools, facilitating data sharing among government agencies and researchers. The core MEGA software has been designed so that it can, independent of the Jordanian system, be freely and readily customized for use by other countries. The system uses such open source technologies as PostgreSQL, PostGIS, GeoServer, OpenLayers, jQuery, and ExtJS

Awards 

The MEGA system was selected as "one of the 100 most significant innovations of 2010" by Netexplorateur:
"The Netexplorateur 100 is a pragmatic approach to the global digital revolution, based on the power of example.
The selection recognizes 100 pioneers who produce mobile applications, web 2.0 sites, software or games, break new ground in culture or education, think up new forms of solidarity or citizenship or transform management methods and business models. These 100 Netexplrateurs are exploring new territories and creating new practices to map out and shape the digital era."

See also
Architectural conservation
Cultural heritage management
GIS in archaeology
Historic preservation

References

External links
Access megajordan.org for viewing only.
Watch a  video overview of the system.

Archaeology of the Near East
Geographic information systems